Placid Njoku (born 10 February 1947) is a Nigerian politician who currently serves as the Deputy Governor of Imo State. He was instated alongside his running mate Hope Uzodinma (the governor) by the verdict of the Supreme Court annulling the election of incumbent Emeka Ihedioha . Placid Njoku earlier served as the first Vice-Chancellor of Michael Okpara University of Agriculture in Abia State.

First years 
He is a native of Ikeduru LGA in Owerri, Imo State. Njoku went and graduated from Michael Okpara University of Agriculture, Abia State and he later worked in the institution and emerged as the first Vice Chancellor of the University. He gained prominence from there.

Politics 
Placid Njoku was chosen as a running-mate by Hope Uzodinma amongst four other candidates in the Imo State APC.

References 

1947 births
Living people
Nigerian Roman Catholics
Igbo people
Igbo politicians
Imo State politicians
Deputy Governors of Nigeria
Vice-Chancellors of Nigerian universities
Academic staff of Michael Okpara University of Agriculture
All Progressives Congress politicians